Halobacillus kuroshimensis is a gram positive, oxidase positive, catalase negative, rod shaped marine bacteria.

S.I. Paul et al. (2021) isolated and characterized Halobacillus kuroshimensis from marine sponges of the Saint Martin's Island of the Bay of Bengal, Bangladesh. Its type strain is DSM 18393; IS-Hb7; JCM 14155.

References

Bacillaceae
Gram-positive bacteria